Lorenzo Hoareau (born 6 January 2007) is a Seychellois footballer who plays as a midfielder for the Seychelles national team.

Youth career
In October 2021 Hoareau was named captain of his school football team in Mont Fleuri. In March 2022 he went on trial with Olympique de Marseille of the French Ligue 1. He was invited back for another trial the following year after he narrowly missed out on being signed by the club on his first attempt.

He returned to his Mont Fleuri school team in 2022. Following the season he was named the Seychelles school league’s Player of the Year.

International career
Hoareau was called up to the senior national team for a friendly tournament in Comoros in September 2021. He went on to make his senior international debut on 1 September 2021 in a match against the hosts. Three days later he earned his second cap and scored his first goal for the Seychelles in a 1–8 defeat to Burundi. At 14 years and 242 days, he became the youngest player from an African nation to score in a senior international fixture and second-youngest scorer worldwide, behind Aung Kyaw Tun.

In November 2022 Hoareau was named to the Seychelles’ under-17 squad for 2023 Africa U-17 Cup of Nations qualification. He went on to score the Seychelles' only goal in the campaign, part of a 1–7 defeat to Zambia on 5 December 2022.

International goals
Last updated 3 February 2022.

International career statistics

References

External links

2007 births
Living people
Association football defenders
Seychellois footballers
Seychelles international footballers